The 2010 European Aquatics Championships were held from 4–15 August 2010 in Budapest and Balatonfüred, Hungary. It was the fourth time that the city of Budapest hosts this event after 1926, 1958 and 2006. Events in swimming, diving, synchronised swimming (synchro) and open water swimming were scheduled.

The 2010 European Water Polo Championships was held separately, from 29 August – 11 September in Zagreb, Croatia.

Schedule 
Competition dates by discipline were:
 Swimming: 9–15 August
 Diving: 10–15 August (exhibition competition on 9 August)
 Synchro: 4–8 August
 Open Water: 4–8 August (in Lake Balaton, based out of Balatonfüred)

Medal table

Swimming

Medal table

Results

Men's events

Women's events

Diving

Medal table

Results

Men's events

Women's events

Team events 

This event was a test event and will not count towards the medal tables.

Synchronised swimming

Medal table

Results

Open water swimming

Medal table

Results

Men's events

Women's events

Mixed events

See also 
 LEN European Aquatics Championships
 List of European Championships records in swimming
 Ligue Européenne de Natation (LEN)
 2010 in swimming
 2009 World Aquatics Championships
 2011 World Aquatics Championships

References

External links 
 
 

 
E
LEN European Aquatics Championships
A
A
European Aquatics
August 2010 sports events in Europe
2010s in Budapest